الوجه قبالة
Daillar (

References 

Populated places in Malayer County